Emelia Rachel Rusciano is an Australian comedian, podcaster, writer, singer and television and radio presenter.

Early life 
Rusciano was born and raised in Greensborough, Victoria, and grew up in Diamond Creek and Warrandyte. She attended Forest Hill College.

Career 
Rusciano has appeared on All Star Family Feud, The Circle, The Project, Studio 10 and Hughesy, We Have a Problem.

Rusciano competed on the second season of Australian Idol, where she finished in ninth place.

In 2009, Rusciano left the 92.9 breakfast show in Perth after four years and returned to Melbourne. From August 2012 to May 2013, she co-hosted the radio show Mamamia Today with Dave Thornton on the Today Network.

In January 2016, Rusciano toured Australia with her stand-up comedy show, Em Rusciano Is Not a Diva.

In June 2016, Rusciano joined the Hit Network to host The Em Rusciano Show on Sunday nights.

Rusciano published her memoir Try Hard: Tales from the Life of a Needy Overachiever on 26 October 2016.

In January 2017, Rusciano was announced as one of two hosts for 2Day FM's new breakfast show. She left the show in September 2018, due to her pregnancy. Rusciano admitted her time at 2Day FM was a "mixed bag".

In 2021, Rusciano appeared on season three of The Masked Singer Australia and finished runner-up as “Dolly”.

Personal life 
Rusciano is married to Scott Barrow and has two daughters and one son. She was diagnosed with ADHD at age 42 and autism in November 2022.

References

External links

1979 births
Australian Idol participants
Australian radio presenters
Australian stand-up comedians
Living people
Singers from Melbourne
Radio personalities from Melbourne
Comedians from Melbourne
21st-century Australian singers
21st-century Australian women singers
Australian women radio presenters
Australian women comedians
People from Nillumbik
People on the autism spectrum
People with attention deficit hyperactivity disorder